Caroline Honoré (born 29 April 1970 at Clermont-Ferrand) is a former French athlete, who specialized in the triple jump.

Biography  
She won two titles French National Championships in the triple jump: in 1993 and 1996.

She twice improved the French triple jump record:  13.51 m and 13.65 m, done  on 23 July 1993  at Annecy during the French championships.

Prize list  
 French Championships in Athletics   :  
 winner of the triple jump 1993 and 1996

Records

Notes and references  
 Docathlé2003, Fédération française d'athlétisme, 2003, p. 409

External links  
 

1970 births
Living people
French female triple jumpers
Sportspeople from Clermont-Ferrand
20th-century French women
21st-century French women